Kasane is a village in the Thane district of Maharashtra, India. It is located in the Bhiwandi taluka. It is situated along AH47 (Mumbai-Nashik highway).

Demographics 

According to the 2011 census of India, Kasane has 343 households. The effective literacy rate (i.e. the literacy rate of population excluding children aged 6 and below) is 80.05%.

References 

Villages in Bhiwandi taluka